Bictegravir (INN; BIC, formerly known as GS-9883) is a second-generation integrase inhibitor (INSTI) class that was structurally derived from an earlier compound dolutegravir by scientists at Gilead Sciences; in vitro and clinical results were presented by Gilead in the summer of 2016. In 2016, bictegravir was in a Phase 3 trial as part of a single tablet regimen in combination with tenofovir alafenamide (TAF) and emtricitabine (FTC) for the treatment of HIV-1 infection and the combination drug bictegravir/emtricitabine/tenofovir alafenamide (Biktarvy) was approved for use in the United States in 2018.

Medical use 
Bictegravir is used a in fixed dose combination with tenofovir alafenamide and emtricitabine for the treatment of HIV-1 infection.

Contraindication 
Bictegravir should not be used with dofetilide and rifampin. Use of dofetilide with bictegravir increases the concentration of dofetilide, which can lead to life-threatening events. Concomitant use of bictegravir and rifampin causes significant interactions because of an effect rifampin has on bictegravir. Bictagravir is metabolized primarily through the liver (CYP3A4), so inducers of CYP3A4 should be avoided.

Adverse effects 
The most common side effects seen in bictegravir use include diarrhea, nausea, and headache.

References

Further reading

External links 
 

Integrase inhibitors
Heterocyclic compounds with 4 rings
Pyridines
Carboxamides
Fluoroarenes